Over the years, the University of Nevada, Reno has had an assortment of people gain regional, national, and international prominence in various fields of study.

Professors

Arts and media

Politics and public service

Sports

Other notables

See also
List of people from Reno, Nevada

References 

Reno, Nevada
 
Lists of people by university or college in Nevada
People